Duke Robert Maria Klemens Philipp Joseph of Württemberg (14 January 1873, in Meran, Austria-Hungary – 12 April 1947, in Schloss Altshausen, Altshausen, Baden-Württemberg, Germany) was a member of the House of Württemberg and a Duke of Württemberg.

Family
Robert was the fourth child of Duke Philipp of Württemberg and his wife Archduchess Maria Theresa of Austria. Robert belonged to the fifth branch (called the ducal branch) of the House of Württemberg, descended from the seventh son of Frederick II Eugene, Duke of Württemberg. On the extinction of the eldest branch in 1921, the ducal branch became the new dynastic-branch of the House.

Marriage
Robert married Archduchess Maria Immakulata of Austria, seventh child and fifth eldest daughter of Archduke Karl Salvator of Austria and his wife Princess Maria Immaculata of Bourbon-Two Sicilies, on 29 October 1900 in Vienna. Robert and Maria Immakulata did not have children.

Military career
Duke Robert was à la suite of the 2nd Pomeranian Uhlan Regiment No. 9 and commander of the 7th Cavalry Division of the Prussian army during World War I.
 1891 : Sekondeleutnant (= Leutnant)
 1896 : Premierleutnant (= Oberleutnant)
 1900 : Rittmeister
 1904 : Major
 1907 : Oberstleutnant
 1909 : Oberst
 1913 : Generalmajor
 1916 : Generalleutnant

Honours

Ancestry

References

1873 births
1947 deaths
Dukes of Württemberg (titular)
People from Merano
Lieutenant generals of Württemberg
Lieutenant generals of Prussia
Knights of the Golden Fleece of Austria
Grand Crosses of the Order of Saint Stephen of Hungary
Recipients of the Military Merit Order (Bavaria)
Knights of the Order of Saint Joseph